Kearis Jamarcus Jackson (born December 9, 1999) is an American football wide receiver for the Georgia Bulldogs.

Early years 
Jackson attended Peach County. In his senior year, Jackson caught 9 touchdowns on 47 receptions for 852 yards. This helped him become a consensus 4-star recruit. His career totals came to 26 receiving touchdowns for 2508 yards with 161 catches. Jackson had offers from Alabama, Auburn, Florida, and Ohio State, but he decided to commit to Georgia.

College career 

Jackson would redshirt his first year on campus. He made his first and only appearance in a blowout of Middle Tennessee State where he got 6 yards on a rushing attempt.

Jackson played sparingly in his second season. He appeared in 4 games and caught 5 passes for 79 yards. He had 2 rushing attempts for 10 yards.

In his third season, Jackson's playing time significantly increased. He appeared in every game of the season and had 514 yards on 36 catches, with three of those catches being touchdowns. His best game was against Auburn where he recorded 147 yards on 9 receptions. His first career touchdown came the following week against Tennessee.

In 2021, Jackson was named to the preseason third team All-SEC. During the season, Jackson dealt with injuries and he didn't make his first appearance until senior day against Charleston Southern. Jackson helped lead the Bulldogs to their first National Championship since 1980 with a 33–18 victory over Alabama. At the season's end, Jackson announced he would return for another season.

References

Further reading 

 
 
 

1999 births
Living people
People from Fort Valley, Georgia
Players of American football from Georgia (U.S. state)
American football wide receivers
Georgia Bulldogs football players